Mariam Saleem is a Pakistani  actress. She made her on-screen debut in 2015 and has acted in television series, film, theater plays and web-series. Slaeem made her cinematic debut in 2017 opposite Shehroz Sabzwari with Chain Aye Na.

Filmography

Film
 Chain Aye Na

Television

Web series

References 

21st-century Pakistani actresses
Pakistani television actresses
Living people
Year of birth missing (living people)